The 2021–22 Greek Basketball Cup was the 47th edition of Greek top-tier level professional domestic basketball cup competition. The previous winner of the cup was Panathinaikos. The cup competition started on 4 September 2021 and ended on 20 February 2022. Olympiacos won the competition.

Format
The top six placed teams from the top-tier level Greek Basket League's 2020–21 season, gained an automatic bye to the 2021–22 Greek Cup quarterfinals. While the seven lower-placed teams from the 2020–21 Greek Basket League season also gained an automatic bye to the 2021–22 Greek Cup phase two, competing for two quarterfinals spots with phase one winners. All sixteen teams from the second-tier level Greek A2 Basket League's 2020–21 season will start from phase one, competing for one spot in phase two of the cup. All rounds were played under a single elimination format.

Preliminary rounds

Phase 1

Round 1

Round 2

Round 3

Round 4

Phase 2

Round 1

Round 2

Final rounds

Awards

Finals Most Valuable Player

Finals Top Scorer

References

External links
 Official Hellenic Basketball Federation Site 
 Official Greek Basket League Site 

Greek Basketball Cup